Mercedes Rein (19 November 1930 – 31 December 2006) was a Uruguayan writer, translator, and dramatist.

Biography
Mercedes Rein was a Professor of Literature in Secondary Education. In 1955 she earned a travel scholarship to the University of Hamburg to study philosophy and letters. She was also an assistant of Hispano-American Literature at the University of the Republic's Faculty of Humanities and Sciences, a position from which she was dismissed by the dictatorship.

In 1956 she became a contributor to the newspaper Marcha, where she intermittently performed literary and theatrical criticism. Rein was one of the members of the jury, along with Juan Carlos Onetti and Jorge Ruffinelli, of the weekly's fateful short story contest, for which Onetti, she, and the author of the story "El guardaespaldas", were imprisoned in 1974.

Rein was part of the independent theater movement.

As a translator (especially of German, as a result of her stay in Germany), she translated texts by Bertolt Brecht (The Caucasian Chalk Circle, The Threepenny Opera, Life of Galileo), Arthur Miller, and Friedrich Dürrenmatt, among others, into Spanish, which she later took to the stage. She also translated Der Kontrabaß by Patrick Süskind into Spanish as El contrabajo.

As a narrator, her disturbing Zoologismos (1967) stands out. With its delirious and obsessive invasion of ghostly presences, it is perhaps the most accomplished of her narrative output. She was also responsible for the lyrics of several songs by Jorge Lazaroff.

As a teacher, in her essay work, in addition to academic works on the German philosopher Ernst Cassirer and the writers Julio Cortázar and Nicanor Parra, there are also some simple manuals of pedagogical design.

Mercedes Rein was a contributor to the weekly Brecha and a member of the Academia Nacional de Letras.

Works

Literature
 Zoologismos (short stories, Montevideo, 1967)
 Casa vacía (novel, Arca, Montevideo, 1984)
 Bocas de tormenta (novel, Arca, Montevideo, 1987)
 Blues de los domingos (short stories, Arca, Montevideo, 1990)
 El archivo de Soto (historical novel, Trilce, Montevideo, 1993)
 Marea Negra (novel, Planeta, 1996)
 La máquina de trinar (poetry, Editorial Libros de la Academia, Montevideo, 2007)

Theater
 La balada de los años cuerdos (children's theater, 1964)
 El herrero y la muerte (with Jorge Curi, 1981)
 Entre gallos y medias noches (with Jorge Curi)
 Juana de Asbaje (1993,  for best play of the year)
 Misia Urraca (children's theater)

Essays
 Ernst Cassirer y la filosofía del lenguaje (FHC, University of the Republic, Montevideo, 1959)
 A propósito de Vallejo y algunas dificultades para conocer la poesía (1966)
 Julio Cortázar, el escritor y sus máscaras (Diaco, 1969)
 Nicanor Parra y la antipoesía (University of the Republic, Montevideo, 1971)
 Cortázar y Carpentier (Editorial Crisis, Buenos Aires, 1974)
 La generación del 98 (Editorial Técnica, Montevideo, 1974)
 Introducción a la poesía de Alberto Machado (Editorial Técnica, 1974)
 Florencio Sánchez, su vida y su obra (Casa del Estudiante, 1975)

References

1930 births
2006 deaths
20th-century Uruguayan educators
20th-century Uruguayan women writers
20th-century Uruguayan writers
21st-century Uruguayan poets
21st-century Uruguayan women writers
German–Spanish translators
Members of the Uruguayan Academy of Language
University of Hamburg alumni
Academic staff of the University of the Republic (Uruguay)
Uruguayan women dramatists and playwrights
Uruguayan literary critics
Women literary critics
Uruguayan novelists
Uruguayan theatre critics
Uruguayan translators
Uruguayan women educators
Uruguayan women essayists
Uruguayan women novelists
Uruguayan women poets
Uruguayan women short story writers
Uruguayan short story writers
Writers from Montevideo
20th-century translators
20th-century essayists